Joseph Holt 'Jodie' Gaines (September 3, 1864 – April 12, 1951) was a U.S. Representative from West Virginia.

Born in Washington, D.C., Gaines moved with his parents to Fayette County, West Virginia, in 1867.
He attended the West Virginia University at Morgantown and was graduated from Princeton College in 1886.
He was admitted to the bar in 1887 and commenced practice in Fayetteville, West Virginia.
He was appointed United States district attorney for West Virginia by President William McKinley in 1897.
He resigned in 1901.

Gaines was elected as a Republican to the Fifty-seventh and to the four succeeding Congresses (March 4, 1901 – March 3, 1911).
He served as chairman of the Committee on Election of President, Vice President, and Representatives (Fifty-eighth through Sixty-first Congresses).
He was an unsuccessful candidate for reelection in 1910.
He resumed the practice of law in Charleston, West Virginia.
He died in Montgomery, West Virginia, April 12, 1951.
He was interred in Spring Hill Cemetery, Charleston, West Virginia.
The town of Jodie, West Virginia was named in his honor.

See also
 List of United States representatives from West Virginia

Sources

1864 births
1951 deaths
19th-century American lawyers
20th-century American lawyers
Burials at Spring Hill Cemetery (Charleston, West Virginia)
Politicians from Charleston, West Virginia
People from Fayetteville, West Virginia
People from Washington, D.C.
United States Attorneys for the District of West Virginia
West Virginia lawyers
West Virginia University alumni
Republican Party members of the United States House of Representatives from West Virginia
Princeton University alumni
Lawyers from Charleston, West Virginia